A partido is the second-level administrative subdivision only in the . They are formally considered to be a single administrative unit, usually contain one or more population centers (i.e., towns and cities), and are divided into localidades. The subdivision in partidos in Buenos Aires Province is distinct from all other provinces of Argentina, which call their second-level subdivisions departamento and are further subdivided into distinct municipalities.

History
By the end of 18th century the town council (cabildo) of Buenos Aires established the first partidos in the countryside: San Isidro del Pago de la Costa (San Isidro) in 1779 and San Vicente, Quilmes, Magdalena, La Matanza, Cañada de Morón (Morón), Las Conchas (Tigre) and  San Pedro in 1784.

At the head of every partido, the cabildo appointed a rural judge called Alcalde de la Santa Hermandad.
The judge, or alcalde, had the mission to maintain the law and order in the surrounding rural area of Buenos Aires, fighting against cattle raiders. The alcalde was helped by a constabulary called Santa Hermandad (Holy Brotherhood) created in the late 15th century by the Catholic Monarchs and transplanted to the colonies.

In 1821 the Governor Martín Rodríguez and his minister Bernardino Rivadavia dissolved the cabildos and since then was the governor itself who appointed the judges, now called Juez de Paz (Justice of the Peace), his administrative territory was called Partido judicial (Judicial district) hence the name of the subdivision.

In 1856 the office of Juez de Paz was replaced by a Presidente de la Municipalidad, or Municipal President. It was appointed by the Governor from a list of three candidates presented by the Municipales, or Councillors, who were elected by the citizens of the different partidos.

Since 1890 the head of the government is called Intendente (Intendant), or Mayor, and is directly elected by the citizens.

On October 24, 1864 the Legislature of the Province of Buenos Aires sanctioned law № 422, dividing the province into 45 partidos: Arrecifes, Baradero, Barrancas al Sud (Avellaneda), Belgrano (Barrio Belgrano), Cañuelas, Carmen de Areco, Chacabuco, Chascomús, Chivilcoy, del Pilar, Ensenada, Exaltación de la Cruz, General las Heras, General San Martín, Giles, Junín, Matanza, Las Conchas (Tigre), Lobos, Lomas de Zamora, Luján, Magdalena, Mercedes, Merlo, Monte, Moreno, Morón, Navarro, Pergamino, Quilmes, Ramallo, Ranchos, Rivadavia, Rojas, Salto, San Antonio, San Fernando, San Isidro, San José de Flores (Barrio Flores), San Nicolás, San Pedro, San Vicente, Suipacha, Viedma and Zárate.

Government

Every partido is administrated by an executive and a legislative branch, respectively, the mayor (intendente) and a council (concejo deliberante), similar to a county council. It is considered a strong mayor-council form of government.

The mayor is elected to four-year terms and can be reelected for a new term. If they have been re-elected, they can not be re-elected in the same position, but with an interval of one period.

The council is a unicameral body, one-half of whose members are elected every two years to serve four-year terms and can be reelected for a new term. If they have been re-elected, they can not be re-elected in the same position, but with an interval of one period.

The number of councillors depends on the population of every partido.
According to decret-law 6769/58 the number of councillors varies as follows:

Partial list of partidos

Buenos Aires Province is divided into 135 partidos.

 Exaltación de la Cruz (Capilla del Señor)
 Ezeiza (Ezeiza)
 Florencio Varela (Florencio Varela)
 Florentino Ameghino (Florentino Ameghino)
 General Alvarado (Miramar)
 General Alvear (General Alvear)
 General Arenales (General Arenales)
 General Belgrano (General Belgrano)
 General Guido (General Guido)
 General La Madrid (General La Madrid)
 General Las Heras (General Las Heras)
 General Lavalle (General Lavalle)
 General Madariaga (General Juan Madariaga)
 General Paz (Ranchos)
 General Pinto (General Pinto)
 General Pueyrredón (Mar del Plata)
 General Rodríguez (General Rodríguez)
 General San Martín (General San Martín)
 General Viamonte (General Viamonte)
 General Villegas (General Villegas)
 Guaminí (Guaminí)
 Hipólito Yrigoyen (Henderson)
 Hurlingham (Hurlingham)
 Ituzaingó (Ituzaingó)
 José C. Paz (José C. Paz)
 Junín (Junín)
 La Costa (Mar del Tuyú)
 La Matanza (San Justo)
 La Plata (La Plata)
 Lanús (Lanús)
 Laprida (Laprida)
 Las Flores (Las Flores)
 Leandro N. Alem (Vedia)
 Lezama (Lezama)
 Lincoln (Lincoln)
 Lobería (Lobería)
 Lobos (Lobos)
 Lomas de Zamora (Lomas de Zamora)
 Luján (Luján)
 Magdalena (Magdalena)
 Maipú (Maipú)
 Malvinas Argentinas (Los Polvorines)
 Mar Chiquita (Coronel Vidal)
 Marcos Paz (Marcos Paz)
 Mercedes (Mercedes)
 Merlo (Merlo)
 Monte Hermoso (Monte Hermoso)
 Moreno (Moreno)
 Morón (Morón)
 Navarro (Navarro)
 Necochea (Necochea)
 Nueve de Julio (Nueve de Julio)
 Olavarría (Olavarría)
 Patagones (Carmen de Patagones)
 Pehuajó (Pehuajó)
 Pellegrini (Pellegrini)
 Pergamino (Pergamino)
 Pila (Pila)
 Pilar (Pilar)
 Pinamar (Pinamar)
 Presidente Perón (Guernica)
 Puan (Puan)
 Punta Indio (Verónica)
 Quilmes (Quilmes)
 Ramallo (Ramallo)
 Rauch (Rauch)
 Rivadavia (América)
 Rojas (Rojas)
 Roque Pérez (Roque Pérez)
 Saavedra (Pigüé)
 Saladillo (Saladillo)
 Salto (Salto)
 Salliqueló (Salliqueló)
 San Andrés de Giles (San Andrés de Giles)
 San Antonio de Areco (San Antonio de Areco)
 San Cayetano (San Cayetano)
 San Fernando (San Fernando)
 San Isidro (San Isidro)
 San Miguel (San Miguel)
 San Miguel del Monte (or Monte) (San Miguel del Monte)
 San Nicolás (San Nicolás de los Arroyos)
 San Pedro (San Pedro)
 San Vicente (San Vicente)
 Suipacha (Suipacha)
 Tandil (Tandil)
 Tapalqué (Tapalqué)
 Tigre (Tigre)
 Tordillo (General Conesa)
 Tornquist (Tornquist)
 Trenque Lauquen (Trenque Lauquen)
 Tres Arroyos (Tres Arroyos)
 Tres de Febrero (Caseros)
 Tres Lomas (Tres Lomas)
 Veinticinco de Mayo (Veinticinco de Mayo)
 Vicente López (Olivos)
 Villa Gesell (Villa Gesell)
 Villarino (Médanos)
 Zárate (Zárate)

See also
 Communes of Buenos Aires – second-level administrative divisions in the Autonomous City of Buenos Aires
 Departments of Argentina – second-level administrative divisions elsewhere in Argentina

External links
 Gobierno de Buenos Aires - Official website of the government of the Province of Buenos Aires
 Short History of the partidos

Types of administrative division
 
Subdivisions of Argentina
Lists of subdivisions of Argentina